Professor Pepper's School of Good Stuff is an animated TV film that debuted in 2006, written and directed by Amy Tam. It was edited by C.K. Thurber, and distributed by National Lampoon, Inc. The name of the movie is taken from the name of The Beatles' album Sgt. Pepper's Lonely Hearts Club Band.

Cast
 Amy Tam - Additional Voices
 C.K. Thurber - Dionea

References

External links
 

2006 television films
2006 films
National Lampoon films
American television films
2000s American animated films